Gonystylus brunnescens grows as a tree up to  tall, with a trunk diameter of up to . Bark is reddish to dark brown. The specific epithet brunnescens is from the Latin meaning "brownish". Its habitat is forest from  altitude. G. brunnescens is found in Peninsular Malaysia and Borneo.

References

brunnescens
Trees of Peninsular Malaysia
Trees of Borneo
Plants described in 1950